Bruce Elliott is a Canadian bridge player.

Bridge accomplishments

Wins

 North American Bridge Championships (4)
 Reisinger (2) 1948, 1951 
 Spingold (2) 1964, 1965

Runners-up

 North American Bridge Championships (1)
 von Zedtwitz Life Master Pairs (1) 1964

Notes

External links

Canadian contract bridge players
Living people
Year of birth missing (living people)